Acute leukemia or acute leukaemia is a family of serious medical conditions relating to an original diagnosis of leukemia. In most cases, these can be classified according to the lineage, myeloid or lymphoid, of the malignant cells that grow uncontrolled, but some are mixed and for those such an assignment is not possible.

Forms of acute leukemia include:
 Acute myeloid leukemia
 Acute erythroid leukemia
 Acute lymphoblastic leukemia
 T-cell acute lymphoblastic leukemia
 Adult T-cell leukemia/lymphoma
 (Precursor) T-lymphoblastic leukemia/lymphoma
 Blast crisis of chronic myelogenous leukemia

References 

 
Leukemia